Andrew Trimble (born 20 October 1984) is a former Irish rugby union player who played for Ulster and represented Ireland at international level.

Club career 
He attended Coleraine Academical Institution, where he competed in the Ulster Schools Cup.

He played at outside centre or on the wing for Ulster Rugby. In April 2006 he signed a new three-year deal with Ulster. Trimble also played club rugby for Ballymena RFC in the AIB League and has represented Ireland Schools and the Ireland U21 team.

Due to a pre-season groin injury, however, he required surgery and missed part of the 2007–08 season. He later underwent a hernia operation. On 30 April 2009, Trimble underwent surgery on his right knee to remove a piece of chipped bone.

In May 2018, Trimble announced that he would be retiring from rugby at the end of the 2017–18 season. He does however, on occasion, still partake in amateur level competition with his local Coleraine rugby club.

International career 
Trimble, replacing the injured Brian O'Driscoll, made his debut for the Ireland national rugby union team during the 2005 IRB Autumn Internationals, against Australia. He started again the following week against Romania, securing victory for the Irish with two tries.

Building on his earlier success, Trimble made the 22-man squad for Ireland's 2006 Six Nations Championship opener against Italy. He came on as a second-half replacement to score his third try against France, the following week. In the 2007 and 2008, Trimble was a member of the Ireland team for the 2007 Rugby World Cup, and played both on the wing and in the centre. Due to injuries, he missed both Ireland's 2008 and 2009 summer tours.

Trimble scored test tries for Ireland at the 2011 Rugby World Cup, and the 2012 Six Nations Championship.

Trimble featured in the 2014 Six Nations Championship, scoring three tries in total, with a crucial one coming in the final Irish game of the championship against France in Paris which sealed the title.

In September 2015, Trimble was left out of the Ireland squad for the 2015 Rugby World Cup.

Honours

Individual
Ulster Rugby Player of the Year (1): (2006)
BT Irish Rugby Union Players Association's newcomer of the year.
Pro14 Team of the Year (1): 2013-14
IRUPA Players' Player of the Year  (1): 2014

Ulster
Celtic League (1): 2005-06

Ireland
Six Nations (1): 2014
Triple Crown (2): 2006, 2007

Personal life 
Trimble attended Coleraine Academical Institution. After graduating, he attended Queen's University Belfast to study physics. After a year however, he dropped out, and decided to study Theology at Belfast Bible College instead. He supports Liverpool F.C. Trimble married his wife, Anna, in March 2009.

Trimble is a devout Christian who reads Psalm 84 to prepare before every match.

Trimble holds both British and Irish passports.

References

External links 
Ulster profile
IRFU profile
ESPNscrum profile

1984 births
Living people
Ballymena R.F.C. players
Irish rugby union players
Ireland international rugby union players
People educated at Coleraine Academical Institution
People from Coleraine, County Londonderry
Rugby union centres
Ulster Rugby players
Ireland Wolfhounds international rugby union players
Virgin Media Television (Ireland) presenters